The 2010–11 Oregon State Beavers men's basketball team represented Oregon State University in the 2010–11 college basketball season. Head coach Craig Robinson was in his third year with the team. The Beavers played their home games at Gill Coliseum in Corvallis, Oregon and were a member of the Pacific-10 conference. They finished the season 11–20, 5–13 in Pac-10 play and lost in the quarterfinals of the 2011 Pacific-10 Conference men's basketball tournament to Arizona.

2010 recruiting class

Roster

Schedule 

|-
!colspan=9 style=| Exhibition

|-
!colspan=9 style=| Regular season

|-
!colspan=9 style=| Pac-10 tournament

Highlights
 The February 3 upset over the Huskies marked the first time the Beavers had beaten a Top 25 ranked team since January 2006. It was also the first time the Beavers had started five players recruited by Robinson in his tenure as head coach.
 March 12, 2011 – Jared Cunningham was named to the Pac-10 All Tournament Team.

References

Oregon State Beavers men's basketball seasons
Oregon State
Oregon State
Oregon State